Evan and Jaron is American music duo Evan and Jaron's second album, released on September 5, 2000. It contains the hit singles "Crazy for This Girl", "From My Head to My Heart" (which was previously on the soundtrack to Runaway Bride), and "The Distance" (which would later be on the Serendipity soundtrack.) "Crazy for This Girl" was the only single to chart on the US Billboard Hot 100, reaching number 15; "From My Head to My Heart" and "The Distance" appeared on the Bubbling Under Hot 100 chart.

Track listing
 "Outerspace" (Evan Lowenstein, Jaron Lowenstein) – 3:53
 "Ready or Not" (Evan, Dan Wilson) – 3:29
 "Crazy for This Girl" (Jaron, Jeff Cohen) – 3:22
 "Done Hangin' on Maybe" (Jaron, Cohen) – 3:32
 "The Distance" (Evan, Ty Lacy) – 4:25
 "Wouldn't It Be Nice to Be Proud" (Evan, Jaron) – 4:12
 "Pick up the Phone" (Evan, Jaron, Glen Ballard) – 3:59
 "From My Head to My Heart" (Evan, Dave Bassett) – 3:10
 "On the Bus" (Evan, Bassett) – 3:41
 "You Don't Know Me" (Evan, Jaron) – 3:32
 "Make It Better" (Evan, Jaron) – 2:58
 "I Could Fall" (Evan, Billy Falcon) – 4:07
 "Crazy for This Girl (Acoustic Version) (2001 Bonus Track)" – 3:19

References

2000 albums
Albums produced by John Fields (record producer)
Columbia Records albums
Evan and Jaron albums